Davisiana is a genus of extremely small deep water sea snails, marine gastropod mollusks in the family Seguenziidae.

Species
Species within the genus Davisiana include:
Davisiana inquirenda Egorova, 1972

References

External links
 To World Register of Marine Species

 
Seguenziidae
Monotypic gastropod genera